The 1897 Kentucky State College Blue and White football team represented Kentucky State College—now known as the University of Kentucky—as a member of the Southern Intercollegiate Athletic Association (SIAA) during the 1897 college football season. Led by Lyman Eaton in his first and only season as head coach, the Blue and White compiled an overall record of 3–4 with a mark of 0–2 in SIAA play.

Schedule

References

Kentucky State College
Kentucky Wildcats football seasons
Kentucky State College Blue and White football